Georgi Karakhanyan is a Russian-born Armenian-American professional mixed martial artist who most recently competed in the Lightweight division of Bellator MMA. A professional competitor since 2006, Karakhanyan has also formerly competed for the Absolute Championship Berkut, World Series of Fighting, DREAM, Tachi Palace Fights, and King of the Cage. Karakhanyan is also the former WSOF Featherweight Champion.

Background
Georgi was born in Moscow to Armenian parents and raised in Moscow, Russia. He was introduced to martial arts by his father at the age of six (Georgi’s father has a black belt third dan in Shotokan Karate and he’s also a Sambo expert). Georgi was just eight years old when he first fought in a full contact martial arts competition. He began training in martial arts at a young age, but found his true love in soccer. He competed at both the amateur and professional levels in Russia, Armenia, Spain and United Kingdom before coming to the United States and settling in Riverside, California. Georgi holds American and Armenian citizenship.

Soccer
He played in clubs Torpedo Moscow and Spartak Moscow.

Mixed martial arts career

Early career
After his soccer career, he began his MMA career while living and training at United Brazilian jiu-jitsu with Instructor, Rommel Dunbar in Riverside, California. Georgi made his first professional MMA debut on October 13, 2006 just after six months of training in Brazilian jiu-jitsu. Although Karakhanyan never dreamt about cage fighting, winning his very first fight against a veteran MMA fighter in the KOTC, gave him enormous confidence and belief that he is on the right path which fueled his desire to give MMA all he had. He joined Bellator to take part in their Season Two Featherweight Tournament and Season Four Featherweight Tournament. On December 2, 2011, Karakhanyan won the Tachi Palace Fights Featherweight Championship.

Bellator
In 2009, Georgi signed with Bellator and was part of the eight-man Featherweight Tournament of Bellator Fighting Championships: Season Two in 2010. In the first round, he took on the veteran fighter Bao Quach at Bellator 13. Karakhanyan won the fight via knockout (knee) at 4:05 of the first round, knocking Quach unconscious. In the semifinals, Georgi faced highly acclimated wrestler and World Greco-Roman Wrestling Champion Joe Warren (Ranked #8 Featherweight in the world) at Bellator 18 and lost the fight via unanimous decision. Joe Warren ended up winning the tournament and became the Bellator Featherweight Champion.

In 2011, Georgi returned for Bellator Fighting Championships: Season Four and faced Patrício Pitbull (Ranked #9 Featherweight in the world) in the first round. Karakhanyan lost via TKO (punches) in the third round. Patricio would also end up winning the tournament.

Tachi Palace Fights
On December 2, 2011 at TPF 11: Redempton, Karakhanyan made his Tachi Palace Fights debut against former Tachi Palace Fights Featherweight Champion Isaac DeJesus for the vacant Tachi Palace Fights Featherweight Championship. De Jesus had never lost his title in a bout; he was stripped of it when he failed to make weight. Karakhanyan defeated De Jesus via triangle choke at 4:02 in the first round to become the new Tachi Palace Fights Featherweight Champion.

Karakhanyan was scheduled to fight The Ultimate Fighter 14 participant Micah Miller on March 9, 2012 at TPF 12: Second Coming in the first defense of his title, but the fight was later canceled due to an illness from Karakhanyan. The bout was moved back to September 7, 2012 at TPF 14: Validation. Karakhanyan defeated Miller via unanimous decision to retain his Tachi Palace Fights Featherweight Championship. Karakhanyan became the first Tachi Palace Fights Featherweight Champion to defend his title.

He later vacated the title in 2013 when he signed with World Series of Fighting.

DREAM
Georgi defeated DREAM Featherweight Champion Hiroyuki Takaya at DREAM 18 (DREAM 18 & GLORY 4 Tokyo) on December 31, 2012 via split decision. The scorecard that gave the fight to Takaya was highly controversial, as Karakhanyan was considered by many to be the clear winner.

World Series of Fighting
Karakhanyan competed on the main card in a fight against Waylon Lowe at World Series of Fighting 5 on September 14, 2013. He won the fight via submission in the first round.

In November 2013, it was announced that Karakhanyan would be fighting for the inaugural WSOF Featherweight Championship against Ricky Glenn at WSOF 7. But an injury to Glenn has forced him out of the title bout and replaced by undefeated featherweight Lance Palmer. Karakhanyan won the bout via submission in the third round to become WSOF's first featherweight champion.

Karakhanyan made the first defense of his title on June 21, 2014 at World Series of Fighting 10: Branch vs. Taylor against Ricky Glenn.  Despite controlling most of the first round via submission attempts, Karakhanyan lost his title when he elected not to continue between the second and third round due to a rib injury.

Return to Bellator
On September 30 Bellator announced that they have re-signed Karakhanyan to a multi-fight contract.

In his return, Karakhanyan faced Bubba Jenkins on January 16, 2015 at Bellator 132. He won the fight via technical submission in the first round. After the bout, Scott Coker announced that Karakhanyan would fight for the Featherweight title next.

Karakhanyan was expected to challenge Patrício Pitbull for his Bellator Featherweight Championship in a rematch on June 19, 2015 at Bellator 138. However, Karakhanyan pulled out of the fight due to a torn ACL and was replaced by Bellator Season Ten Featherweight tournament winner Daniel Weichel.

Karakhanyan faced Daniel Weichel on December 4, 2015 at Bellator 147. He lost the fight via unanimous decision.

After losing two fights in a row, Karakhanyan faced Bubba Jenkins in a rematch at Bellator 160 on August 26, 2016. Jenkins was favored to win the rematch, but Karakhanyan won again, this time via knock out the first minute into the first round.

Karakhanyan made a quick return to the cage as he faced Kirill Medvedovsky at Bellator 164 on November 10, 2016. He won the fight via TKO due to an injury in the first round.

Karakhanyan faced Emmanuel Sanchez at Bellator 170 on January 21, 2017. He lost the fight via majority decision.

Karakhanyan faced Daniel Pineda at Bellator 182 on August 25, 2017. He won the fight via TKO due to a doctor stoppage on a cut Pineda had suffered in the second round.

Karakhanyan faced Henry Corrales at Bellator 192 on January 20, 2018.  He lost the fight via unanimous decision and was subsequently released from the promotion.

Absolute Championship Berkut
On March 7, 2018 ACB announced that they had signed Karakhanyan to a multi-fight contract. Karakhanyan won his promotional debut against Alexey Polpudnikov at ACB 86 via unanimous decision.

Karakhanyan faced Timur Nagibin at ACB 90 on November 10, 2018. In the first round, Karakhanyan locked a guillotine choke and claimed that Nagibin tapped to the choke just before the round's end. Karakhanyan released the choke when the referee intervened but at the time it was unclear whether it was due to the tap or the bell. Nevertheless, Nagibin hit Karakhanyan after the bell. Karakhanyan was clearly rocked and tried to wrestle his coach when he entered the cage. Due to the incident, Nagibin was disqualified immediately by officials. However, after the fight the promotion disqualified Karakhnanyan, blaming him to having faked being hurt and acted unsportsmanlike before the fight. Eventually, the bout was ruled as a no contest by the promotion. In Karakhanyan's response in social media, he claimed that the promotion officials encouraged him to trash talk even more as the fight was gaining attention. The promotion withheld Karakhanyan's win money and released him from his contract.

Second return to Bellator
Karakhanyan returned to Bellator in 2019 as a replacement for Ashleigh Grimshaw against Emmanuel Sanchez in the main event at Bellator 218. He lost the bout by unanimous decision.

Next Karakhanyan faced A. J. McKee at Bellator 228 on September 28, 20219. He lost the fight via knockout in just eight seconds.

Karakhanyan replaced Ryan Scope on short notice at Bellator 240 on February 22, 2020 against Paul Redmond. Karakhanyan won the fight via second round submission.

Karakhanyan faced Myles Jury on August 7, 2020 at Bellator 243. He lost the fight via split decision.

Karakhanyan was expected to face Adam Piccolotti on May 21, 2021 at Bellator 259. However, Piccolotti pulled out due to injury.

Karakhanyan faced Kiefer Crosbie on July 31, 2021 at Bellator 263. He won the bout via arm-triangle choke in the first round.

Karakhanyan, as a replacement for Adam Piccolotti, faced Saul Rogers on September 18, 2021 at Bellator 266. He lost the bout via unanimous decision.

Karakhanyan faced Adam Piccolotti on February 19, 2022 at Bellator 274. He lost the bout via unanimous decision.

Karakhanyan faced Kane Mousah on September 23, 2022 at Bellator 285. He lost the bout via unanimous decision.

Boxing 
Georgi defeated Tatsuro Irie on May 5, 2012 in his promotional boxing debut at Welterweight.

Personal life
Georgi has three children.

Championships and accomplishments

Mixed martial arts
Tachi Palace Fights
TPF Featherweight Champion (One time)
World Series of Fighting
WSOF Featherweight Championship (One time)

Jiu Jitsu
Grapplers Quest
Grapplers Quest 2012 Men's No Gi Advanced 150 lb-159.9 lb Champion

Mixed martial arts record

|-
|Loss
|align=center|31–14–1 (1)
|Kane Mousah
|Decision (unanimous)
|Bellator 285
|
|align=center|3
|align=center|5:00
|Dublin, Ireland
|
|-
|Loss
|align=center|31–13–1 (1)
|Adam Piccolotti
|Decision (unanimous)
|Bellator 274
|
|align=center|3
|align=center|5:00
|Uncasville, Connecticut, United States
|
|- 
|Loss
|align=center|31–12–1 (1)
|Saul Rogers
|Decision (unanimous)
|Bellator 266
|
|align=center|3
|align=center|5:00
|San Jose, California, United States
|
|-
|Win
|align=center|31–11–1 (1)
|Kiefer Crosbie
|Submission (arm-triangle choke)
|Bellator 263
|
|align=center|1
|align=center|4:25
|Los Angeles, California, United States
|
|-
|Win
|align=center|30–11–1 (1)
|Bryce Logan 
|Decision (split)
|Bellator 251
|
|align=center|3
|align=center|5:00
|Uncasville, Connecticut, United States
|
|-
|Loss
|align=center|29–11–1 (1)
|Myles Jury
|Decision (split)
|Bellator 243
|
|align=center|3
|align=center|5:00
|Uncasville, Connecticut, United States
|
|-
|Win
|align=center|29–10–1 (1)
|Paul Redmond
|Submission (guillotine choke) 
|Bellator 240
|
|align=center|2
|align=center|0:42
|Dublin, Ireland
|
|-
| Loss
| align=center| (1)
|A. J. McKee 
|KO (punches)
|Bellator 228
|
|align=center|1
|align=center|0:08
|Inglewood, California, United States
|
|-
| Loss
| align=center|28–9–1 (1)
| Emmanuel Sanchez
| Decision (unanimous)
| Bellator 218
| 
| align=center| 3
| align=center| 5:00
| Thackerville, Oklahoma, United States
| 
|-
|NC
|align=center|28–8–1 (1)
|Timur Nagibin
|NC (overturned by promotion)
|ACB 90: Vakhaev vs. Aliakbari
|
|align=center|1
|align=center|5:00
|Moscow, Russia
|
|-
|Win
|align=center|28–8–1
|Alexey Polpudnikov
|Decision (unanimous)
|ACB 86: Raisov vs. Balaev
|
|align=center|3
|align=center|5:00
|Moscow, Russia
|
|-
| Loss
| align=center|27–8–1
|  Henry Corrales
| Decision (unanimous)
| Bellator 192
| 
| align=center| 3
| align=center| 5:00
| Inglewood, California, United States
| 
|-
| Win
| align=center|27–7–1
|  Daniel Pineda
| TKO (doctor stoppage)
| Bellator 182
| 
| align=center| 2
| align=center| 4:05
| Verona, New York, United States
| 
|-
| Loss
| align=center|26–7–1
|  Emmanuel Sanchez
| Decision (majority)
| Bellator 170
| 
| align=center| 3
| align=center| 5:00
| Inglewood, California, United States
| 
|-
| Win
| align=center|26–6–1
|  Kirill Medvedovsky
| TKO (injury)
| Bellator 164
| 
| align=center| 1
| align=center| 3:40
| Tel Aviv, Israel
|
|-
| Win
| align=center|25–6–1 
| Bubba Jenkins
| KO (punch)
| Bellator 160
| 
| align=center| 1
| align=center| 0:53
| Anaheim, California, United States
| 
|-
| Loss
| align=center|24–6–1 
| Pat Curran
| Decision (unanimous)
| Bellator 155
| 
| align=center| 3
| align=center| 5:00
| Boise, Idaho, United States
| 
|-
| Loss
|align=center|24–5–1 
|Daniel Weichel
| Decision (unanimous)
|Bellator 147
|
|align=center|3
|align=center|5:00
|San Jose, California, United States 
|
|-
| Win
|align=center| 24–4–1 
|Bubba Jenkins
|Technical Submission (guillotine choke)
|Bellator 132
|
|align=center|1
|align=center|1:49
|Temecula, California, United States
|
|-
| Loss
| align=center| 23–4–1 
| Ricky Glenn
| TKO (retirement)
| WSOF 10
| 
| align=center| 2
| align=center| 5:00
| Las Vegas, Nevada, United States
| 
|-
| Win
| align=center| 23–3–1 
| Lance Palmer
| Submission (guillotine choke)
| WSOF 7
| 
| align=center| 3
| align=center| 4:40
| Vancouver, British Columbia, Canada
| 
|-
| Win
| align=center| 22–3–1 
| Waylon Lowe
| Submission (guillotine choke)
| WSOF 5
| 
| align=center| 1
| align=center| 3:37
| Atlantic City, New Jersey, United States
| 
|-
| Win
| align=center| 21–3–1
| Din Thomas
| Decision (unanimous)
| Legacy FC 19
| 
| align=center| 3
| align=center| 5:00
| Dallas, Texas, United States
| 
|-
| Win
| align=center| 20–3–1
| Hiroyuki Takaya
| Decision (split)
| DREAM 18
| 
| align=center| 3
| align=center| 5:00
| Saitama, Japan
| 
|-
| Win
| align=center| 19–3–1
| Micah Miller
| Decision (unanimous)
| Tachi Palace Fights 14
| 
| align=center| 5
| align=center| 5:00
| Lemoore, California, United States
| 
|-
| Win
| align=center| 18–3–1
| Aaron Mobley
| KO (punches)
| Gladiator Challenge: Star Wars
| 
| align=center| 1
| align=center| 1:03
| San Jacinto, California, United States
| 
|-
| Win
| align=center| 17–3–1
| Isaac DeJesus 
| Submission (triangle choke)
| TPF 11: Redemption
| 
| align=center| 1
| align=center| 4:02
| Lemoore, California, United States
| 
|-
| Win
| align=center| 16–3–1
| Vince Ortiz 
| Submission (rear-naked choke)
| BAMMA USA: Badbeat 2
| 
| align=center| 1
| align=center| 2:01
| Commerce, California, United States
| 
|-
| Win
| align=center| 15–3–1
| Anthony Hayes
| Submission (triangle choke)
| Gladiator Challenge
| 
| align=center| 1
| align=center| 1:09
| San Jacinto, California, United States
| 
|-
| Loss
| align=center| 14–3–1
| Patrício Pitbull
| TKO (punches)
| Bellator 37
| 
| align=center| 3
| align=center| 0:56
| Concho, Oklahoma, United States
| 
|-
| Win
| align=center| 14–2–1
| Anthony Leone
| Decision (unanimous)
| Bellator 28
| 
| align=center| 3
| align=center| 5:00
| New Orleans, Louisiana, United States
| 
|-
| Loss
| align=center| 13–2–1
| Joe Warren
| Decision (unanimous)
| Bellator 18
| 
| align=center| 3
| align=center| 5:00
| Monroe, Louisiana, United States
| 
|-
| Win
| align=center| 13–1–1
| Bao Quach
| KO (knee)
| Bellator 13
| 
| align=center| 1
| align=center| 4:05
| Hollywood, Florida, United States
| 
|-
| Win
| align=center| 12–1–1
| Albert Rios
| Decision (unanimous)
| Call to Arms 1
| 
| align=center| 3
| align=center| 5:00
| Ontario, California, United States
| 
|-
| Win
| align=center| 11–1–1
| Justin Salazar
| Submission (armbar)
| Missouri Total Fighting 4
| 
| align=center| 1
| align=center| 3:11
| Grain Valley, Missouri, United States
| 
|-
| Win
| align=center| 10–1–1
| James Pettus
| Submission (guillotine choke)
| Missouri Total Fighting 4
| 
| align=center| 1
| align=center| 4:09
| Grain Valley, Missouri, United States
| 
|-
| Win
| align=center| 9–1–1
| Jeff Sanchez
| Submission (north-south choke)
| GC 85: Cross Fire
| 
| align=center| 1
| align=center| 1:12
| San Diego, California, United States
| 
|-
| Win
| align=center| 8–1–1
| Jesse Miramontes
| Submission (rear-naked choke)
| Apocalypse Fights 2
| 
| align=center| 1
| align=center| 1:50
| Palm Springs, Florida, United States
| 
|-
| Win
| align=center| 7–1–1
| Justin Salazar
| TKO (punches)
| True Fight Fans
| 
| align=center| 2
| align=center| 2:14
| Grain Valley, Missouri, United States
| 
|-
| Win
| align=center| 6–1–1
| Daniel Perez
| Submission (kimura)
| Apocalypse Fights 1
| 
| align=center| 1
| align=center| N/A
| Palm Springs, Florida, United States
| 
|-
| Win
| align=center| 5–1–1
| Armando Sanchez
| Decision (unanimous)
| KOTC: Opposing Force
| 
| align=center| 3
| align=center| 5:00
| Highland, California, United States
| 
|-
| Loss
| align=center| 4–1–1
| Chris David
| Decision (split)
| Gladiator Challenge 74: Evolution 
| 
| align=center| 3
| align=center| 5:00
| Los Angeles, California, United States
| 
|-
| Win
| align=center| 4–0–1
| Hildred Oliney
| Submission (rear-naked choke) 
| WCO: Kerr vs. Gavin
| 
| align=center| 1
| align=center| N/A
| Hollywood, California, United States
| 
|-
| Win
| align=center| 3–0–1
| Bobby Merrill
| KO (flying knee and punches)
| EFWC: The Untamed
| 
| align=center| 2
| align=center| 0:09
| Anaheim, California, United States
| 
|-
| Win
| align=center| 2–0–1
| Doug Dufur
| Submission (rear-naked choke)
| Galaxy Productions
| 
| align=center| 1
| align=center| 1:46
| California, United States
| 
|-
| Draw
| align=center| 1–0–1
| Juan Carlos Huerta
| Draw
| KOTC: Epicenter
| 
| align=center| 2
| align=center| 5:00
| San Jacinto, California, United States
| 
|-
| Win
| align=center| 1–0
| Brent Wooten
| Submission (guillotine choke) 
| KOTC: BOOYAA
| 
| align=center| 2
| align=center| 1:18
| San Jacinto, California, United States
|

Boxing record

See also
 List of current Bellator fighters
 List of male mixed martial artists

References

External links

 http://www.georgimma.com/
 
 Is Georgi Karakhanyan the Most Dangerous Featherweight in Bellator?
 Recapping With Georgi Karakhanyan - I Like To Fight A Lot
 Georgi Karakhanyan ~ The Humble And The Insane
 Fight Path: Bellator's Georgi Karakhanyan on the path from soccer star to "Insane"
 http://www.hyefighters.com

Martial artists from Moscow
Armenian male mixed martial artists
American male mixed martial artists
Russian male mixed martial artists
Featherweight mixed martial artists
Mixed martial artists utilizing boxing
Mixed martial artists utilizing Brazilian jiu-jitsu
Mixed martial artists from California
Russian people of Armenian descent
American people of Armenian descent
Russian emigrants to the United States
Russian male boxers
American male boxers
Armenian male boxers
Russian practitioners of Brazilian jiu-jitsu
American practitioners of Brazilian jiu-jitsu
Armenian practitioners of Brazilian jiu-jitsu
People awarded a black belt in Brazilian jiu-jitsu
Living people
1985 births
People from Riverside, California